De Nederlandsche Bank NV (DNB) is the central bank of the Netherlands. Founded by King William I in 1814, it is part of the European System of Central Banks (ESCB) and the Eurosystem. De Nederlandsche Bank is a public limited company (Dutch: naamloze vennootschap, abbreviated NV) whose everyday policy is overseen by the Governing Board. Being a public limited company, DNB has a Supervisory Board (Dutch: Raad van Commissarissen).

Until 1999 when the Netherlands adopted the euro, the bank was responsible for the former national Dutch currency, the Dutch guilder.

In addition, there is an advisory body called the Bank Council (Dutch: Bankraad). As a public entity the DNB has a function as both part of the European System of Central Banks (ESCB) and an independent public body (Dutch: zelfstandig bestuursorgaan). As a part of the ESCB, DNB is co-responsible for the determination and implementation of the monetary policy for the eurozone, besides being a link in the international payment system. As an independent public body, DNB exercises prudential supervision of financial institutions.

History
On 2 May 1998, the European heads of state or government decided that the Economic and Monetary Union (EMU) would begin on 1 January 1999 with eleven Member States of the European Union (EU), the Netherlands included. As from 1 June 1998, the Dutch central bank, De Nederlandsche Bank N.V., forms part of the European System of Central Banks (ESCB). On the same day, the new Bank Act (of 1998) came into force. Nearly 185 years into its existence, the Nederlandsche Bank has entered a new phase.

Tasks 

Under the 1998 Bank Act – replacing that of 1948 – the Bank has the following tasks:

 Within the framework of the ESCB, the Bank shall contribute to the definition and implementation of monetary policy within the European Community (EC). The Bank has the objective to maintain price stability. Without prejudice to this objective, the Bank shall support the general economic policy in the EC.
 The Bank shall hold and manage the official foreign reserves, and shall conduct foreign-exchange operations.
 The Bank shall collect statistical data and produce statistics.
 The Bank shall promote the smooth operation of payment systems; it shall take care of the banknote circulation.
 The Bank shall supervise banks, investment institutions and exchange offices.
 The Bank may, subject to permission by Royal Decree, perform other tasks in the public interest. The European Central Bank (ECB) may also ask the Bank to perform extra tasks.

The first two tasks – also known as the ESCB tasks – ensue entirely from the Maastricht Treaty. Decisions in these areas are taken at the European level by the ECB Governing Council, on which the President of the Nederlandsche Bank has a seat. Promoting the smooth operation of payment systems has both a European and a national dimension. The statistical task is also partly ESCB-related and partly a national concern. The DNB is responsible for international macro-economic statistical analysis for countries outside the EU. These two tasks will not be transferred to ESCB level at the start of EMU. Here the Nederlandsche Bank remains fully in control. However, in a Europe where economies are becoming increasingly interlocked, many banking supervisory rules are drawn up at the international level. DNB serves as the banker's bank to general Dutch banks.

One of the government appointed members of the Social-Economic Council is always a representative of DNB.

Head office

In the 1860s, a purpose-built head office, designed by architect , was erected on the same location and inaugurated in 1869. Nearly a century later in 1968, as the bank has left the building for its new seat, it was taken over by the University of Amsterdam which had long been established just nearby, and subsequently repurposed as the location of the Allard Pierson Museum, which opened there in October 1976.

Architect 's stark design of 1961 consisted on a low square base and a rectangular office tower. In the late 1980s, as the bank was running out of space, it was complemented with a second, oval tower designed in 1984 by architects  and Marc a Campo, whose construction was finished in 1989. In 2008, Marc a Campo designed a further extension by adding an extra floor to the square base. In a comprehensive renovation during the early 2020s, the oval tower was demolished and the base remodeled to return the building to an exterior appearance more similar to the original one of the 1960s.

List of presidents

See also

Economy of the Netherlands
European Central Bank
Central Bank of Curaçao and Sint Maarten
Central Bank of Aruba
Euro
Dutch gulden
Netherlands Authority for the Financial Markets

References

External links 
 Official site of De Nederlandsche Bank
European Central Bank

Banks of the Netherlands
Skyscrapers in Amsterdam
European System of Central Banks
Central banks
Banks established in 1814
1814 establishments in the Netherlands